The mixed team RS:One competition at the 2018 Asian Games was held from 24 to 31 August 2018. Each team was consisted of one male sailor and one female sailor, the individual man's and woman's score was added together to give the overall Mixed Team's score for that event.

Schedule
All times are Western Indonesia Time (UTC+07:00)

Results

References

External links
Official website

Mixed RS:One